Lyons or Lyon is a city in France. 

Lyons may also refer to:

Places

Australia 
 Lyons, Australian Capital Territory
 Lyons, Northern Territory
 Lyons, Queensland
 Division of Lyons (state), a state electoral division of Tasmania
 Division of Lyons, a federal electoral division of Tasmania

France 
 Lyons-la-Forêt, France

Ireland
 Lyons Hill, Ireland

United States 
 Lyons, Colorado
 Lyons, Georgia
 Lyons, Illinois
 Lyons, Indiana
 Lyons, Kansas
 Lyons, Michigan
 Lyons, Missouri
 Lyons, Nebraska
 Lyons, New Jersey
 Lyons, New York
 Lyons (hamlet), New York
 Lyons Falls, New York
 Lyons, Ohio
 Lyons Switch, Oklahoma
 Lyons, Oregon
 Lyons, Pennsylvania
 Lyons, South Dakota
 Lyons, Texas
 Lyons, Wisconsin, a town
 Lyons (community), Wisconsin, an unincorporated community
 Lyons Township (disambiguation)

People
 Lyons (surname)
 Lyons family, also de Lyons and Lyon, a prominent Anglo-Norman noble family
 Lyons Gray, American politician
 Justice Lyons (disambiguation)

Other uses
 Lyons (architecture firm), an Australian company
 The Lyons, a 2011 play
 Lyon's, a California restaurant chain
 J. Lyons and Co., a British food company, once proprietor of Lyons Corner Houses

See also 
 
 Lyon (disambiguation)
 Lion (disambiguation), including Lions